The term evolutionary trap has retained several definitions associated with different biological disciplines.

Within evolutionary biology, this term has been used sporadically to refer to cases in which an evolved, and presumably adaptive, trait suddenly became maladaptive, leading to the extinction of the species.

Within behavioral and ecological sciences, evolutionary traps occur when rapid environmental change triggers organisms to make maladaptive behavioral decisions. While these traps may take place within any type of behavioral context (e.g. mate selection, navigation, nest-site selection), the most empirically and theoretically well-understood type of evolutionary trap is the ecological trap which represents maladaptive habitat selection behavior.

Witherington demonstrates an interesting case of a "navigational trap". Over evolutionary time, hatchling sea turtles have evolved the tendency to migrate toward the light of the moon upon emerging from their sand nests. However, in the modern world, this has resulted in them tending to orient towards bright beach-front lighting, which is a more intense light source than the moon. As a result, the hatchlings migrate up the beach and away from the ocean where they exhaust themselves, desiccate and die either as a result of exhaustion, dehydration or predation.

Habitat selection is an extremely important process in the lifespan of most organisms. That choice affects nearly all of an individual's subsequent choices, so it may not be particularly surprising the type of evolutionary trap with the best empirical support is the ecological trap. Even so, traps may be relatively difficult to detect and so the lack of evidence for other types of evolutionary trap may be a result of the paucity of researchers looking for them coupled with the demanding evidence required to demonstrate their existence.

See also
 Ecological trap
 Perceptual trap
 Coextinction
 Mass extinction
 Evolutionary anachronism

References

Conservation biology
Evolutionary biology concepts